Deadlier Than the Male is a 1967 British crime and mystery film. It is one of the many take-offs of James Bond produced during the 1960s, but is based on an already established detective fiction hero, Bulldog Drummond.

Richard Johnson (director Terence Young's original preference to play James Bond) stars as Drummond, updated to a suave Korean War veteran, now an insurance investigator, trailing a pair of sexy assassins (Elke Sommer and Sylva Koscina) who kill for sport and profit. Drummond's American nephew, Robert Drummond (Steve Carlson, then a Universal Pictures contract star), becomes involved in the intrigue when he comes to visit.

The title is a reference to the 1911 Rudyard Kipling poem "The Female of the Species", which includes the line, "The female of the species must be deadlier than the male", and also refers to Sapper's earlier Drummond book, The Female of the Species. The working title of the film was The Female of the Species. "Deadlier Than the Male", the song featured in the film's opening credit sequence, was performed by the Walker Brothers.

Filmed in Technicolor and Techniscope, portions of the film were shot in Lerici, La Spezia, Liguria, Italy. A sequel, Some Girls Do, followed in 1969.

Plot
Glamorous assassin Irma Eckman (Elke Sommer), disguised as an air stewardess, kills oil tycoon Henry Keller (Dervis Ward) with a booby-trapped cigar aboard his private jet, parachuting away before the plane explodes. She is picked up by a speedboat driven by her partner in crime, the equally beautiful Penelope (Sylva Koscina). The villainous pair then murder David Wyngarde (John Stone), making it look like a spear fishing accident. Sir John Bledlow (Laurence Naismith), one of the directors of Phoenecian  Oil, suspects that both deaths were the result of foul play; he had received an urgent message from Wyngarde that he needed to get in touch with Keller regarding a "matter of life and death". He asks Wyngarde's friend, Hugh "Bulldog" Drummond (Richard Johnson), to investigate.

A representative of an unknown party had approached Phoenecian and offered to overcome Keller's opposition to a merger with Phoenician within six months for one million pounds. Irma shows up at a board meeting to collect. However, the board is divided – with Henry Bridgenorth (Leonard Rossiter) being the most vocal in opposition – and the vote is five to four against paying. That night, Irma and Penelope visit Bridgenorth at his apartment, with fatal results. When the board reconvenes, the directors vote unanimously to pay.
 
Carloggio (George Pastell), Wyngarde's servant, delivers a tiny bit of a taped message Wyngarde had recorded. Only part of one sentence remains (the assassins stole the rest). Irma and Penelope silence Carloggio, then Penelope delivers a box of deadly cigars to Drummond's flat while he is out. Brenda (Virginia North), a girl Drummond's nephew Robert (Steve Carlson) has brought back to the flat, narrowly escapes the same fate as Keller. Later that night, another attempt is made on Drummond's life.

The next day, Irma makes Phoenecian another proposition: to get them the oil concession in the country of Akmata, despite the King's determination to develop the oil fields himself, for another million pounds. Drummond realises that the King's assassination is what the garbled tape was referring to. Meanwhile, Penelope abducts and tortures Robert, but he can tell her nothing. Drummond follows Irma back to their flat and is able to rescue Robert before he is blown up by a bomb left behind by the two women. He is then astonished to discover that Robert is an old college friend of the Akmatan King Fedra (Zia Mohyeddin).

Irma does away with Weston (Nigel Green), another Phoenecian board member. Drummond travels to the Mediterranean coast. After meeting and warning King Fedra, he is invited to a castle owned by the wealthy Carl Petersen, the genius behind the assassinations. It turns out that Petersen is none other than Weston. Drummond is not allowed to leave the castle. Irma attempts to seduce Drummond to distract him, but to her fury, he rejects her advances. Grace (Suzanna Leigh), one of Petersen's women, confides her desire to leave to Drummond, but Petersen is watching and listening electronically. Penelope is more successful in being Drummond's minder for Petersen and spends the night in Drummond's bed.

Petersen gives Grace a "second chance"; she uses the opportunity to board the King's yacht as soon as she has the chance, just as Petersen had planned. While playing chess against Petersen with giant motorized pieces, Drummond learns that Grace is unwittingly carrying the bomb intended for the King. He kills Petersen's bodyguard Chang (Milton Reid) and drops Petersen into the hole through which a chess piece is removed from play.

Drummond and Robert race to the King's yacht, capturing Irma and Penelope along the way, and bringing them along. When Irma and Penelope refuse to tell him where the bomb is hidden, Drummond searches Grace for the explosive, finally stripping her naked and throwing her overboard. When the guard holding Irma and Penelope at gunpoint is distracted by this, the pair escape. As they race away in a speedboat, Irma reveals that the bomb is in Grace's hairclip. Penelope is aghast; having envied Grace's chignon, she stole it and is wearing it. The two assassins are killed when it explodes. Meanwhile, Drummond and Robert dive into the sea to rescue Grace.

Cast

 Richard Johnson as Hugh 'Bulldog' Drummond, a secret agent assigned to investigate mysterious killings. 
 Elke Sommer as Irma Eckman, one of Carl Petersen's assassins along with Penelope. 
 Sylva Koscina as Penelope, one of Carl Petersen's assassins along with Irma. 
 Nigel Green as Weston / Carl Petersen, a wicked man and the boss of Irma and Penelope.  
 Suzanna Leigh as Grace, one of Petersen's assistants who falls in love with Drummond. 
 Steve Carlson as Robert Drummond, Hugh Drummond's nephew 
 Virginia North as Brenda, Robert's girlfriend. 
 Justine Lord as Peggy Ashenden, Bledlow's secretary
 Leonard Rossiter as Henry Bridgenorth, one of the murdered men 
 Laurence Naismith as Sir John Bledlow, Peggy's boss 
 Zia Mohyeddin as King Fedra, an Arabian king and friend of Robert. 
 Lee Montague as Boxer, a crime boss and friend of Drummond's. 
 Milton Reid as Chang, Petersen's brutish henchman 
 Yasuko Nagazumi as Mitsouko, one of Petersen's assassins
 Didi Sydow as Anna, one of Petersen's assassins 
 George Pastell as Carloggio
 John Stone as David Wyngarde, Drummond's friend who assigns him to the case. 
 Dervis Ward as Keller, the first person to be killed by Irma at the beginning of the film. 
 William Mervyn as A Chairman of the Phoenician Board

Production
The success of the James Bond films saw a revival in the novels of Bulldog Drummond. The film was publicity announced in December 1964 (under the title of Female of the Species) but it wasn't filmed until 1966.

It was the first production from Amerlon Productions, a subsidiary of Inflight, the company that showed in-flight movies. Richard Johnson, then best known for being the husband of Kim Novak, was cast as Drummond.

Filming began in London on 23 May 1966.

In an interview, Ralph Thomas stated that the film was intended as a pilot for a television series. It was filmed in three months with Thomas admitting he did it for "greed. I had three months; they gave me a lot of money; I had a lot of fun and I enjoyed making it. It was a great location and the picture looked gorgeous. That's it."

Sommer was paid $170,000 for her role.

Johnson later said:
I consciously tried to use more of myself than in anything else I've done... It was an entirely new creation that was not in the Drummond books. I couldn't respect the man. He was bigoted and brutal. A Nazi character. I didn't attempt to make myself into that character. We started with a fresh page. I said, all right, if you want me, you'll get me, but this is a braver, more physical version of me. 
The producers battled the British Board of Film Censors who strongly objected to the film's use of women assassins, torture and promiscuity, earning the film an X rating.

References

External links 
 
 
 
 Review of film at Variety
 Article on Chess Pieces at moon city garbage agency

Films based on Bulldog Drummond
1967 films
1960s crime films
1960s spy thriller films
1960s action films
British spy thriller films
British action films
British crime films 
1960s English-language films
Films directed by Ralph Thomas
Films produced by Betty Box
Films scored by Malcolm Lockyer
Films set in the Mediterranean Sea
Films shot in Italy
Reboot films
Films with screenplays by Jimmy Sangster
1960s British films